George Cressler Young (né Jung; August 4, 1916 – April 24, 2015) was a United States district judge of the United States District Court for the Northern District of Florida, the United States District Court for the Middle District of Florida and the United States District Court for the Southern District of Florida.

Education and career

Born on August 4, 1916, in Cincinnati, Ohio, Young received an Artium Baccalaureus degree in 1938 from the University of Florida and a Bachelor of Laws in 1940 from the Fredric G. Levin College of Law at the University of Florida. He entered private practice in Winter Haven, Florida from 1941 to 1942. He served as a lieutenant in the United States Navy from 1942 to 1946. He returned to private practice in Miami, Florida to 1947 to 1948. He served as an administrative assistant to United States Representative and United States Senator George Smathers from 1948 to 1951. He returned to private practice in Jacksonville, Florida from 1951 to 1961.

Federal judicial service

Young was nominated by President John F. Kennedy on September 5, 1961, to a joint seat on the United States District Court for the Northern District of Florida and the United States District Court for the Southern District of Florida vacated by Judge George William Whitehurst. He was confirmed by the United States Senate on September 14, 1961, and received his commission on September 18, 1961. He was assigned by operation of law to serve additionally on the United States District Court for the Middle District of Florida on October 29, 1962, to a new seat authorized by 76 Stat. 247. His service on the Northern and Southern Districts was terminated on September 17, 1966, and he thereafter served solely on the Middle District. He served as Chief Judge from 1973 to 1981. He assumed senior status on October 19, 1981. His service terminated on April 24, 2015, due to his death of a heart attack in Orlando, Florida.

See also
 List of United States federal judges by longevity of service

References

Sources
 

1916 births
2015 deaths
Lawyers from Cincinnati
Judges of the United States District Court for the Middle District of Florida
Judges of the United States District Court for the Northern District of Florida
Judges of the United States District Court for the Southern District of Florida
United States district court judges appointed by John F. Kennedy
20th-century American judges
University of Florida alumni
United States Navy officers
United States Navy personnel of World War II
Fredric G. Levin College of Law alumni